Laughing Hyenas was an American post-hardcore band from Ann Arbor, Michigan, that existed from 1985 to 1995, fronted by Negative Approach vocalist John Brannon. According to AllMusic, "At first, the band specialized in dirges overlaid with the tortuous, throat-shredding vocals of frontman John Brannon. As time passed, their blues connections became more and more explicit".

History
Laughing Hyenas formed in 1985 in Ann Arbor, Michigan. The original lineup consisted of vocalist Brannon (previously of Negative Approach), guitarist Larissa Strickland (aka Larissa Stolarchuk, previously of L-Seven), drummer Jim Kimball and bassist Kevin Strickland (aka Kevin Munro). Following an eponymous 1986 demo cassette, they released their debut EP, Come Down to the Merry Go Round in 1987 on Touch and Go Records.

The band released their first studio album, You Can't Pray a Lie, in 1989. Life of Crime followed in 1990, both recorded by future Nirvana producer Butch Vig. Later that year, the original rhythm section of Kimball and Kevin Strickland left the Hyenas and teamed up with P.W. Long to form Mule. In 1991, they recorded an Alice Cooper song for the Sub Pop singles club tribute to Cooper. After their departure, former Necros members Todd Swalla (drums) and Kevin Ries (bass) joined the band, which released the Crawl EP in 1992. Ries was later replaced by another Necros bassist, Ron Sakowski, who appeared on their third and final album, Hard Times (1995). The band self-released a covers EP, Covers: Stolen Tapes 92 to 94 that same year, before splitting.

Brannon later formed the American band, Easy Action, and reunited with Negative Approach.

Larissa Strickland died on October 8, 2006, at the age of 46, from a drug overdose in North Port, Florida.

Former members
 John Brannon – vocals (1985–1995)
 Larissa Strickland (Larissa Stolarchuk) – guitar (1985–1995)
 Jim Kimball – drums (1985–1990)
 Kevin Strickland (Kevin Munro) – bass guitar (1985–1990)
 Todd Swalla – drums (1990–1995)
 Kevin Ries –  bass guitar (1990–1994)
 Ron Sakowski – bass guitar (1994–1995)

Discography

Studio albums
Merry go Round (1987, Touch And Go Records) – 1995 Re-issue 
You Can't Pray a Lie (1989, Touch and Go Records)
Life of Crime (1990, Touch and Go Records)
Hard Times (1995, Touch and Go Records)

Singles and EPs
Laughing Hyenas demo cassette EP (1986, self-released)
Come Down to the Merry Go Round EP (1987, Touch and Go Records) 
"Here We Go Again" 7-inch EP (1987, Touch and Go Records)
Crawl EP (1992, Touch and Go Records) 
Covers: Stolen Tapes 92 to 94 EP (1995, self-released)

Compilation albums
Life of Crime/You Can't Pray a Lie (1990, Touch and Go Records)

Compilation appearances
"Dedications to the One I Love (Live)" on Howl 7 EP (1990, Howl)
"Public Animal #9" (Alice Cooper cover) on Alice Cooper Tribute EP (1991, Sub Pop Records)
"Candy" on Mesomorph Enduros (1992, Big Cat)
"Solid Gold Hell" (The Scientists cover) on Set It on Fire! (1993, Dog Meat)
"Shine" on  Jabberjaw...Pure Sweet Hell  (1996, Mammoth Records)
"Just Can't Win" on American Pie 2 (1996, Rubber Records)

References

External links
Band's biography / discography
[ Allmusic entry on Laughing Hyenas]
Trouser Press entry on Laughing Hyenas
Laughing Hyenas Website on Touch and Go Records
Official 1988 Tour Diary

Indie rock musical groups from Michigan
Musical groups established in 1985
Musical groups disestablished in 1995
Musical quartets
Punk blues musical groups
Touch and Go Records artists
1985 establishments in Michigan
Third Man Records artists
Musicians from Ann Arbor, Michigan